Buzková may refer to

 Petra Buzková (b. 1965), former minister of the Czech Republic
 Ivana Buzková (b. 1985), Czech figure skater